Özgürlükçü Demokrasi (Turkish for "Libertarian democracy") is an Istanbul-based online newspaper in Turkish language that primarily targets readers of Kurdish origin. It was launched on 23 August 2016, only days after pro-Kurdish newspaper Özgür Gündem was closed following a court ruling. Its website is not accessible in Turkey.

References

Middle Eastern news websites
Newspapers published in Istanbul
Turkish-language newspapers
Turkish Kurdish organizations
Publications established in 2016
2016 establishments in Turkey
Beyoğlu